4510 may refer to:
 The year in the 46th century
 MOS Technology 4510, an 8-bit microprocessor chip
 RFC 4510, a published standard for the Lightweight Directory Access Protocol for computer communication
 4510 Shawna, an asteroid